Liga Bet (lit. League B) is the fourth tier of the Israeli football league system. It is divided into four regional divisions.

History
League football started in Israel in 1949–50, a year after the Israeli Declaration of Independence. However, the financial and security crises gripping the young nation caused the 1950–51 season to be abandoned before it had started. When football resumed in 1951–52, the new top division went by the name of Liga Alef with Liga Bet as the second division. The 1952–53 season was also not played, and Liga Bet resumed in 1953–54.

In the 1955–56 season, Liga Leumit came into existence as the new top division, with Liga Alef becoming the second division and Liga Bet demoted to the third division. Restructuring in 1976 saw the creation of Liga Artzit as a new second tier, and the second demotion of Liga Bet, as it became the fourth division. Further restructuring to create the Israeli Premier League in 1999 saw Liga Bet demoted again, this time to the fifth tier. At the end of the 2008–09 season, Liga Artzit was scrapped as the Premier League and Liga Leumit were expanded to 16 clubs each, resulting in Liga Bet returning to the fourth tier.

Structure
Since the 1959-60 season, Liga Bet is split into four regional divisions, North A, North B, South A and South B. Because Israel's northern half is much more densely populated than the desert south, the divisions are not spread equally and the southernmost division, South B, covers about two-thirds of the country. Although this inequality is partially offset by the fact that there are so few clubs south of Beersheba (Arad, Dimona, Yeroham, Mitzpe Ramon and Eilat are the only sizable towns south of the city), the northern clubs tend to be clustered in the Galilee region, making travel to away matches much less of a chore.

Each division has sixteen clubs, who play each other home and away to make a 30-game season. The club finishing top of each regional division is promoted to Liga Alef, whilst the second to fifth-placed clubs in each division play-off at the end of the season, until the play-off winner of North A faces the play-off winner of North B, and the play-off winner of South A faces the play-off winner of South B. The two winners advance to a decisive match against the two third-bottom clubs in Liga Alef, North and South, for a place in that division. The club finishing bottom of each regional division is relegated to Liga Gimel, the fifth and bottom tier, whilst another club from each division is relegated after relegation play-offs, involving the clubs that finished twelfth to fifteenth in each division. Coming into Liga Bet are the two clubs are relegated from each of the regional Liga Alef divisions (and one or two more, had they failed the play-off) and the eight clubs promoted from Liga Gimel. The clubs are then pooled and assigned to the most geographically appropriate of the four divisions.

Current members
The following teams participating at the 2020-2021 season:

Liga Bet North A
Ahi Acre
Hapoel Arraba
Ahva Kafr Manda
Al-Nahda Nazareth
Beitar Nahariya
Bnei Bir al-Maksur
Bnei M.M.B.E.
Hapoel Tuba-Zangariyye
Ironi Bnei Kabul
Maccabi Bnei Nahf
Maccabi Sektzia Ma'alot-Tarshiha
Tzeirei Kafr Kanna
Tzeirei Tamra
Tzeiri Sakhnin

Liga Bet North B
F.C. Pardes Hanna Lior Bokar
Hapoel Beit She'an Mesilot
Hapoel Bnei Musmus
Hapoel Ihud Bnei Jatt
Hapoel Ramot Menashe Megiddo
Hapoel Sandala Gilboa
Hapoel Tirat HaCarmel 
Ihud Bnei Baqa
Ihud Bnei Kafr Qara
Ironi Nesher
Maccabi Ahi Iksal
Maccabi Neve Sha'anan Eldad
Maccabi Nujeidat Ahmad
Maccabi Umm al-Fahm

Liga Bet South A
Beitar Kfar Saba
Beitar Petah Tikva
Beitar Ramat Gan
F.C. Bnei Jaffa Ortodoxim
Hapoel Hod HaSharon
Hapoel Kafr Bara
Hapoel Kafr Qasim Shouaa
Hapoel Kiryat Ono
Hapoel Mahane Yehuda
Hapoel Qalansawe
Ironi Beit Dagan
Maccabi Amishav Petah Tikva
Otzma Holon
Shimshon Bnei Tayibe
Shimshon Tel Aviv

Liga Bet South B
Beitar Ironi Ma'ale Adumim
Beitar Kiryat Gat
Beitar Yavne
Bnei Eilat
F.C. Be'er Sheva
F.C. Shikun HaMizrah
Hapoel Gedera
Hapoel Lod
Hapoel Yeruham
Ironi Kuseife
Ironi Modi'in
Maccabi Ironi Netivot
Maccabi Ironi Sderot
Maccabi Kiryat Malakhi
Tzeirei Rahat

Previous seasons

North A

1 

2 

3 

4 

5 

6 

7 

8 

9 

10 

11

North B

1 

2 

3 

4 

5 

6 

7

South A

1 

2 

3 

4 

5 

6 

7 

8 

9

South B

1 

2 

3 

4 

5 

6 

7 

8 

9 

10 

11

External links
Israel Football Association

 
4
Isr
Professional sports leagues in Israel